The name Yuchun could refer to:

Li Yuchun, a Chinese pop singer
Park Yoo-chun, a Korean singer known as Yuchun
Chang Yuchun, a general from the Ming dynasty
My Girlfriend (YUCHUN from 東方神起), a 2008 pop single
Yi Inmun, a painter also known as Yuchun